Main Hall may refer to:

in China
 Mahavira Hall, the main hall of traditional Buddhist temples

in Japan
 Main Hall (Japanese Buddhism), of a Buddhist temple
 Honden, the main hall of a shinto Shrine

in the United States

Main Hall (Raymond, Mississippi), listed on the NRHP in Hinds County, Mississippi
Main Hall (Springfield, South Dakota), listed on the NRHP in Bon Homme County, South Dakota
Main Hall, Randolph-Macon Women's College, Lynchburg, Virginia, NRHP-listed
Main Hall (Lawrence University), Appleton, Wisconsin, NRHP-listed
Main Hall (De Pere, Wisconsin), listed on the NRHP in Brown County, Wisconsin
Main Hall/La Crosse State Normal School, La Crosse, Wisconsin, NRHP-listed

See also
Old Main

Architectural disambiguation pages